The Massese is an Italian breed of domestic sheep from the Alpi Apuane mountains of the province of Massa Carrara, in Tuscany in central Italy. It takes its name from the town of Massa. It is raised throughout most of Tuscany, and also in Emilia–Romagna, Liguria and Umbria. It has common origins with the other indigenous sheep breeds of the Apennines.

History 
The Massese has common origins with the other indigenous sheep breeds of the Apennines. It is one of the seventeen autochthonous Italian sheep breeds for which a genealogical herd-book is kept by the Associazione Nazionale della Pastorizia, the Italian national association of sheep-breeders. The herd-book was established in 1971. Total numbers for the breed were recorded as 182,690 in 1986, of which 66% were in Tuscany and 27% in Emilia–Romagna. In 2006 the population was estimated at 55,000, of which 16,477 were registered in the herd-book; in 2013 the number recorded in the herd-book was 8423.

Use 
The Massese remains in oestrus throughout the year, and normally lambs three times every two years; this, coupled with a twinning rate of 135%, allows production of two lambs per year. They are slaughtered at a weight of  

The milk has on average 6.2% fat and 5.3% protein.

References

Sheep breeds originating in Italy